Castra Martis was a Roman fortified garrison (castra) in Dacia which became a town and bishopric and remains a Latin Catholic titular see.

History 
Castra Martis, named after the Roman god of war Mars, on the modern site of Kula (Latin/Italian Cula), in Vidin Province in northwestern Bulgaria, served to protect the road through Vrashka Chuka pass in the western Balkan mountains.

It was important enough in the Roman province of Dacia ripensis to become a suffragan of the provincial capital's Metropolitan Archdiocese of Ratiaria, in the sway of the Patriarchate of Constantinople. Its only recorded Suffragan Bishop was Calvus, participant at the Council of Serdica in 343 (called by the Pope, boycotted by most Eastern sees).

In 408, the Huns under Uldin took control of the site during an attack on the Eastern Roman Empire, apparently by treachery.

Titular see 
The diocese was nominally restored in 1933 as Latin Titular bishopric of Castra Martis (Latin) / Castra di Marte (Curiate Italian) / Castromartianus (Latin adjective).

It has had the following incumbents, so far of the fitting Episcopal (lowest) rank :

 Platon Kornyljak (born Ukraine) (1959.04.17 – death 2000.11.01), first as Apostolic Exarch of Germany and Scandinavia of the Ukrainians (Germany etc.) (1959.04.17 – retired 1996.12.16), then on emeritate
 Petro Kryk (born Poland) (2000.11.20 – ...), Apostolic Exarch of Germany and Scandinavia of the Ukrainians (Germany), no previous prelature.

Eponymy 
 Castra Martis Hill on Livingston Island, in the South Shetland Islands, West Antarctica, is named after it.

See also 
 List of Catholic dioceses in Bulgaria

Notes

Sources and external links 
 GCatholic - (former and) Latin titular bishopric
 Bibliography
 Pius Bonifacius Gams, Series episcoporum Ecclesiae Catholicae, Leipzig 1931, p. 428
 Daniele Farlati-Jacopo Coleti, Illyricum Sacrum, vol. VII, Venice 1817, p. 611
 Jacques Zeiller, Les origines chrétiennes dans les provinces danubiennes de l'empire romain, Paris 1918, p. 155.

Tourist attractions in Vidin Province
Buildings and structures in Vidin Province
Roman legionary fortresses in Bulgaria
Kula Municipality, Bulgaria
Castles in Bulgaria
Roman Dacia